Tennis at the 1983 Southeast Asian Games was held at Singapore Tennis Center, Singapore City, Singapore. Tennis events was held between 29 May to 5 June.

Medal winners

Medal table

References

 https://eresources.nlb.gov.sg/newspapers/Digitised/Article/straitstimes19830530-1.2.106
 https://eresources.nlb.gov.sg/newspapers/Digitised/Article/straitstimes19830531-1.2.123
 https://eresources.nlb.gov.sg/newspapers/Digitised/Article/straitstimes19830601-1.2.137
 https://eresources.nlb.gov.sg/newspapers/Digitised/Article/straitstimes19830602-1.2.102

1983
1983 Southeast Asian Games events
1983 in tennis